

Helvécio Martins (27 July 1930 – 14 May 2005) was the first person of Black African descent to be called as a general authority of the Church of Jesus Christ of Latter-day Saints (LDS Church).

Born to descendants of African slaves in Rio de Janeiro, Brazil, Martins joined the LDS Church in 1972, despite his knowledge that the LDS Church did not then allow members of Black African descent to hold the priesthood or to receive temple ordinances.

On 9 June 1978, Martins and his family heard of the announcement that the LDS Church was lifting the priesthood ban. After Martins received the priesthood and his temple ordinances, he served in the church as a bishop, counselor to a stake president, and as president of the Brazil Fortaleza Mission.

In April 1990, church president Ezra Taft Benson called Martins as a member of the Second Quorum of the Seventy. Martins became the first black general authority in the LDS Church.

After serving a standard five-year term as a member of the Second Quorum of the Seventy, Martins was honorably released as a general authority on 30 September 1995. He died in Santo André, São Paulo, Brazil at age 74.

Martins dictated his life story which was published as The Autobiography of Elder Helvecio Martins.

Martins' son, Marcus, is the chair of the religion department at Brigham Young University–Hawaii.

See also 
1978 Revelation on Priesthood
Blacks and The Church of Jesus Christ of Latter-day Saints
Joseph W. Sitati

Notes

References 
"Elder Helvécio Martins of the Seventy", Ensign, May 1990, p. 106.

External links 
Obituary by LDS Genesis Group
Grampa Bill's G.A. Pages: Helvécio Martins

1930 births
Brazilian general authorities (LDS Church)
Brazilian Mormon missionaries
Converts to Mormonism
Members of the Second Quorum of the Seventy (LDS Church)
Mission presidents (LDS Church)
Mormonism and race
Mormon missionaries in Brazil
People from Rio de Janeiro (city)
20th-century Mormon missionaries
2005 deaths
Black Mormons